Tiaré Scanda (born Tiaré Scanda Flores on January 6, 1974 in Mexico City, D.F., Mexico) is a Mexican actress.

Filmography

Awards and nominations

TVyNovelas Awards

Premios Diosas de Plata

Premios Ariel

References

External links

 Official Site of Tiaré Scanda

1974 births
Living people
Mexican telenovela actresses
Mexican television actresses
Mexican film actresses
Mexican stage actresses
Mexican female models
Actresses from Mexico City
20th-century Mexican actresses
21st-century Mexican actresses
People from Mexico City